Arthur Meredyth (March 1639 – 4 May 1732) was an Irish politician. 

Meredyth was the second son of Thomas Meredyth and Letitia Fortescue, and the grandson of Richard Meredith.

He was High Sheriff of Meath in 1679 and 1682. Meredyth was the Member of Parliament for Navan in the Irish House of Commons between 1692 and 1713, and again from 1715 to 1727.

He married Dorothea Bingley in 1661 and a daughter and four sons, including Thomas Meredyth.

References

1639 births
1732 deaths
17th-century Anglo-Irish people
18th-century Anglo-Irish people
High Sheriffs of Meath
Irish MPs 1692–1693
Irish MPs 1695–1699
Irish MPs 1703–1713
Irish MPs 1715–1727
Members of the Parliament of Ireland (pre-1801) for County Meath constituencies
Arthur